Gazetted Officers are executive/managerial level ranked government officers in India. Authority for a Gazetted Officer officer to issue an official stamp comes from the President of India or the Governors of States. To that effect, they are de jure representatives and delegates of the Indian State and the President. If and only if a person's appointment is published in the Gazette of India or any state government gazette with their name, he/she is called Gazetted.

Any appointment released and published in the government gazette is called a gazetted appointment. The Gazette of India and state gazettes are official government publications, which publish the appointments or promotions of certain government officials along with other government ordinary/extraordinary notifications. An officer, who is appointed under the seal of the Governor at the state level or by the President of India at the national level (and in the Union Territories), requires being listed in the Gazette of India or state government gazette and is considered to be a Gazetted Officer. Many are honorary Justices of the Peace and have the same standing as some of the government officers. Such officers, among other functions, have the power to verify the documents for financial, industrial, immigration, and other purposes.

A notary public is also a gazetted officer.

Military ranks 

Indian Military ranks do not fall under the "Central Civil Services (Classification, Control and Appeal) Rules, 1965" law. However, Commissioned Officers of Army, Navy and Air Force hold  commission of The  President of India, and are considered as gazetted ranks of group A and B respectively. However, JCO ranks do not receive Commission by the President of India and are not considered as Gazette officers.  The ranks of Defence Servants are categorized as Commissioned Officers (CO), Junior Commissioned Officers (JCO) and Other Ranks (OR).

Civilian Public Servant ranks

4 levels of ranks 

The civil service  posts under the Union of India have been classified as Group A, B, and C. The Central Government of India or any State Government classifies civil service (government employees) into Group A (Gazetted/Executive), Group B (Gazetted), Group B (Non-Gazetted), Group C and Group D. Earlier classification was Class I (Gazetted), II (Gazetted), II (Non-Gazetted), III and IV. Class I or Group A is the highest rank class and Class IV or Group D is the least. The Government of India has plans to merge Group D into Group C. Class I and II (Gazetted) belong to the class of officers whose transfers, appointments, promotions and superannuation are published on a yearly basis in the official gazette of State or Union Government.

Gazetted

Group A (Gazetted), formerly called Class I

Group A (Gazetted), formerly called Class I, officials belong to the managerial or highest class of government employees who are placed in Level 10 and above in  Pay matrices, Previously in the pay band 3 with 5400 grade pay and above in 6th CPC and Level 10 above in Pay Matrix in 7th CPC pay structure. However, Pay structure (Grade Pay or Level) is not the sole criteria and many though drawing pay in above pay structure due to financial upgradation under MACP Scheme, etc., may not be holding class I rank.
Examples - Indian Judicial Service Officers, Civil Servants of the All India Services i.e. IAS, IPS, IFoS,ADO (Agriculture Development officer), IOFHS,;Officers of 61 Central Organized Group A Civil Services including IFS,ICoAS,IA&AS,ICLS, IPoS, ITS,IIS, IP&TAFS, ISS, IRS,IRTS, IRAS, IRPS, IRPFS,  Officers of  Engineering Services Officers, Indian Ordnance Factory Service Officer's, Indian Defence Service of Engineers (IDSE), All India Railway Officers (IRSS, IRSE, IRSME, IRSEE, IRSSE, IRAS, IRPS, IRTS, IRPFS, IRHS,Under Secretaries/Dy. Directors/Dy. Secretaries/Jt. Directors/Directors, etc. in Secretariat, Sr Audit/Account officers/Sr Divisional Accounts officers in IA&AD, Engineers of ISRO, DRDO, BARC, DAE, AERB, Examiner of Patents and Designs (O/o-CGPDTM, DPIIT, Ministry of Commerce and industry), Geologist/Director/Director General (DG)/DDG/ADG and Geo scientists from Central Geological Services (Geological Survey of India, GSI), scientists of ISRO (Technical Officers of ISRO), Officers of the Information Technology (IT) Cadres of GNCTD/Central Govt etc.) (Gr A. Techno-Administrative posts are named as System Analyst (SA)- Assistant Director(IT)/ Sr. System Analyst-Deputy Diretor(IT,)/Joint Director (IT)/Director(IT)/etc), MeitY, NIC, DRDO ( Technical Officers of DRDO), BARC, DAE, AERB also fall under this category. Central Secretariat Service (abbreviated as CSS) is the Ministrial cadre of Central Govt. , Under Secretary and above are Group A post of this Central Civil Services. Assistant Professor and above in Central, State or in an Autonomous University, State Governments also appoint certain category officers under Group A Services in State Civil Services but officials of PSUs/Autonomous bodies, etc. though in above pay structure, are not classified as Group A (Gazetted) as their names are not notified in the Gazette of the Government. Officers of Autonomous bodies/ PSUs (Even Group 'A') are not Gazetted, however high they may be in the Rank. ADO (Agriculture Development officer) are also class1 Gazzted group A Officers.

Group B (Gazetted), formerly called Class II (Gazetted)

Group B (Gazetted), formerly called Class II (Gazetted) examples include - DANIPS, DANICS, Puducherry Civil Service, Puducherry Police Service, Section officers of AFHQ Civil Services and Central Secretariat Services, Chief Pharmacists, Appraiser/Superintendents of GST and Customs, Income Tax Officers, Asst. Audit/Accounts Officers of Indian Audit & Accounts Department,Asst. Accounts Officers of Defence Accounts Department, Indian P&T Accounts & Financial Services, Junior Works Manager (Indian Ordnance Factory's), PS and Sr. PS in various ministries, JCOs in Armed Forces, Principal/Headmaster of Government High School, Officers in State Civil Services, and Labour Enforcement Officers etc.

Documents certification authority

 Character certificate, Police records verification: Commissioned officers of Indian Armed Forces, Group A Officers.
 Citizenship certification:'' Group A officers, certification is limited to very few officials such as Sub-Divisional Magistrate, etc.
Verification for issue of Passport: It can be done by the Group 'A' officers of the rank of Under Secretary/Dy. Director (Grade Pay 6600/Level 11) and above and Officers of Indian Armed Forces of Pay Level 11 and above (Maj/Lt Cdr/Sqn Ldr) .

Non-Gazetted

Government Employees falling under the category of Group C (formerly called class III) and Group D (formerly called class IV) are not gazetted. They do not have the personal authority to issue an official stamp on behalf of the Government. Further, Class III employees and Class IV employees serving in  central public sector undertakings are also classified as non-gazetted employees and officers of central public sector banks can also attest financial documents.

Group B (Non-Gazetted), formerly Class II (Non-Gazetted)Group B (Non-Gazetted), formerly called Class II (Non-Gazetted) examples are - Assistant Section Officers in various ministries, Stenographers Grade '1', Senior Pharmacists various different Health Departments Junior Engineers in different departments of Union and State Govts, Income Tax Inspectors,Customs / GST Inspectors, Sub-inspector in CAPF's etc.

Group C, formerly called Class IIIGroup C, formerly called Class III, are the public servants in non-supervisory roles. Examples are - Pharmacists, Lab technicians, Head Clerks / Section Heads, Police Head Constables, Typists, Stenographers, Tax Assistants, Telephone operators, TTEs, Junior Engineers, Senior Section Engineers of Railways, etc.

Group D (now subsumed in Group C), formerly Class IVGroup D (now subsumed in Group C), formerly Class IV''' category since stands upgraded to Group C lowest pay scale of PB1 Grade Pay Rs.1800 in 6th CPC pay structure en masse on account of implementation of recommendations of 6th CPC, though continuing to largely perform their erstwhile manual functions. Their recruitment qualification also stands upgraded to Matric or ITI. In 7th CPC pay structure they are in Level 1 in Pay Matrix. They are generally Manual workers (skilled or semi-skilled).
Examples - Peons, Sweepers, Junior Clerks, Multi Tasking Staff (MTS),Track men Grade IV and Group D in Railways, etc.

Notary Public as Gazetted Officer 

A Notary Public is also a Gazetted officer as per the law stated in the Notaries act, 1952. Section 6, Notaries act, 1952 states the annual publication of lists of notaries. It reads as:-

See also 
 SSC Combined Graduate Level Examination

References

External links
 
List of notaries

Titles
Civil Services of India
Indian government officials